Steven Goret (born 25 June 2001) is an international motorcycle speedway rider from France.

Speedway career 
In 2021, Goret helped France qualify for the final of the 2021 Speedway of Nations (the World team Championships of speedway). He competed in the 2021 Individual Speedway Junior World Championship.

Goret joined the Plymouth Gladiators for the SGB Championship 2021.

References 

Living people
2001 births
French speedway riders
Plymouth Gladiators speedway riders